My Name Is Joe Thomas (stylized as #MYNAMEISJOETHOMAS) is the thirteenth studio album by American recording artist Joe. It was released on November 11, 2016 by Plaid Takeover and BMG Rights Management. Joe reteamed with longtime contributors Derrick "D.O.A." Allen and Plaid Takeover head Gerald Isaac to work on the majority of the album. My Name Is Joe Thomas received generally positive reviews from critics and debuted at number 17 on the US Billboard 200.

Release and reception

Allmusic editor Andy Kellman gave the album three and a half out of five stars and wrote that while My Name Is Joe Thomas "has the appearance of a nostalgia trip, it isn't one. Recorded mostly with Derrick "D.O.A." Allen, Gerald Isaac, and Damo Farmer, it covers all his usual ground in inspired fashion, and like the earlier 2010s albums offers a diverse range of heartfelt, never oversold material." Referring to Joe's announcement that he was seriously considering retiring from music, Kellman concluded: "If this is truly it, Thomas figuratively and literally went out on a high note."

Upon its release, My Name Is Joe Thomas debuted at number two Billboards Top R&B/Hip-Hop Albums  in the issue dated December 3, 2016, selling 17,000 copies in its first week, according to Nielsen Music. It marked his 16th career entry and 11th top five-placing set on the chart. The album also debuted at number 17 on the US Billboard 200 and launched at number one on the R&B Albums chart, his third album to do since 2013.

Track listing
Credits adapted from the liner notes of My Name Is Joe Thomas.

Samples
 "Our Anthem" contains a sample of "Try a Little Tenderness", as performed by Otis Redding, and an interpolation of "Lift Every Voice And Sing" by James Weldon Johnson and "The Star-Spangled Banner" by Francis Scott Key.

Charts

Release history

References

External links
[ My Name Is Joe Thomas] at Allmusic

2016 albums
Joe (singer) albums